Aan is a 1952 Indian film.

Aan may also refer to:
 Aan: Men at Work, a 2004 Indian film
 Aan River, a river in New Zealand
 Alexander Aan (born 1981), imprisoned atheist in Indonesia
 aan, ISO 639 code of the Anambé language of Brazil

AAN may also refer to:
 Aaron's, Inc. stock ticker symbol, a chain of rent-to-own stores
 Afghanistan Analysts Network, a research organization based in Afghanistan
 Al Ain International Airport, IATA airport code
 America's Auction Network, an American shopping channel
 American Academy of Neurology, a medical specialty society
 American Academy of Nursing, a professional society
 American Action Network, a right-wing issue advocacy group
 Ask a Ninja, a series of comedy videos
 Association of Alternative Newsweeklies, a North American trade association
 Australian Approved Name, drug generic names approved by the TGA to be used in Australia